Wałbrzych (or Walmbrich;  or ) is a city located in the Lower Silesian Voivodeship, in southwestern Poland. From 1975–1998 it was the capital of Wałbrzych Voivodeship; it is now the seat of Wałbrzych County. Wałbrzych has the status of municipality.

Wałbrzych was once a major coal mining and industrial center alongside most of Silesia. The city was left undamaged after World War II and possesses rich historical architecture; among the most recognizable landmarks is the Książ Castle, the largest castle of Lower Silesia and the third-largest in Poland.

In 2015 Wałbrzych became widely known due to the search for an allegedly buried Nazi gold train, which however was not found.

Etymology 
The German name  (also meaning 'forest castle') referred to the castle Nowy Dwór, whose ruins stand south of the city; the name came to be used for the entire settlement. It first appeared in the 15th century.

History

Middle Ages 

Polish sources indicate the city's predecessor, Lasogród, was an early medieval Slavic settlement whose inhabitants engaged in hunting, honey gathering, and later agriculture. Lasogród eventually developed into a defensive fort, the remains of which were destroyed in the 19th century during expansion of the city. However, some German sources say no archaeological or written records support notions of an early West Slavic or Lechitic settlement nor the existence of a castle before the late 13th century. They also denounce the idea that during the Middle Ages the area of Wałbrzych was part of an unpopulated Silesian forest, known as the Silesian Przesieka. In April 2022, a coin hoard was discovered near Wałbrzych dating from the first half of the 13th century.

According to 17th-century Polish historian Ephraim Naso, Wałbrzych was a small village by 1191. This assertion was rejected by 19th-century German sources and by German historian Hugo Weczerka, who says the city was founded between 1290 and 1293, and was mentioned as Waldenberc in 1305.
He places the city near Nowy Dwór, built by Bolko I the Strict of the Silesian Piasts. The city website, however, cites the building of the castle as a separate event in 1290. A part of Nowy Dwór castle, a manor built in the 17th century, was destroyed in the 19th century. Nevertheless, the region became part of Poland after the establishment of the state under the Piast dynasty in the 10th century and during the fragmentation of the realm, it was part of various Polish-ruled duchies, the last of which was the Duchy of Świdnica until 1392, later it was also part of the Bohemian Crown and Hungary.

The settlement was first mentioned as a town in 1426, but it did not receive the rights to hold markets or other privileges due to the competition of nearby towns and the insignificance of the local landlords. Subsequently, the city became the property of the Silesian knightly families, initially the Schaffgotsches in 1372, later the Czettritzes, and from 1738, the Hochberg family, owners of Fürstenstein Castle.

Modern era 

Coal mining in the area was first mentioned in 1536. The settlement was transformed into an industrial centre at the turn of the 19th century, when coal mining and weaving flourished.

As a result of the First Silesian War the city was annexed by the Kingdom of Prussia in 1742, and subsequently became part of Germany in 1871. In 1843 the city obtained its first rail connection, which linked it with Breslau (now Wrocław, Poland). In the early 20th century a glassworks and a large china tableware manufacturing plant, which are still in operation today, were built. In 1939 the city had about 65,000 inhabitants. During World War II, the Germans established and operated labour units for Italians from the Stalag VIII-A prisoner-of-war camp, a forced labour subcamp of the Stalag VIII-B/344 prisoner-of-war camp, a forced labour camp for Jewish men and women, two subcamps of the Gross-Rosen concentration camp, intended for Jews, located in the present Gaj and Książ districts, and a Nazi prison. It was conquered by the Soviet Red Army on 8 May 1945 – coincidentally, the day World War II in Europe ended.

After World War II, Waldenburg became part of Poland under border changes demanded by the Soviet Union at the Potsdam Conference and was renamed to its historic Polish name Wałbrzych. Many of the Germans living in the city fled or were expelled in accordance to the Potsdam Agreement. The town was repopulated by Poles expelled from former eastern Poland annexed by the Soviet Union, particularly from Borysław, Drohobycz and Stanisławów, as well as Poles returning from France and Belgium and from forced labour in Germany. Wałbrzych was one of the few areas where a number of Germans were held back as they were deemed indispensable for the economy, e.g. coal mining. An ethnic German society has been maintained in Wałbrzych since 1957. Greeks, refugees of the Greek Civil War, settled in Wałbrzych in the 1950s.

The city was relatively unscathed by the Second World War, and as a result of combining the nearby administrative districts with the town and the construction of new housing estates, Wałbrzych expanded geographically. At the beginning of the 1990s, because of new social and economic conditions, a decision was made to close down the town's coal mines. In 1995, a Museum of Industry and Technology was set up on the facilities of the oldest coal mine in the area, KWK THOREZ. The 2005 the film  was filmed in and around Wałbrzych.

Geography 

Wałbrzych is located in the Central Sudeten Mountains, near the border with the Czech Republic and Germany. The city is located by the Pełcznica River at 450–500 m above sea level in a picturesque structural basin of Wałbrzych above which there are wooded ranges of the Wałbrzych Mountains. The highest elevation in the city is Mount Borowa, also known as the Black Mountain, 853 m (2798 ft) above sea level, with an observation tower since 2007, which is the highest peak of the Wałbrzych mountains.

There are seven city parks in the city, and in the main city park (King Jan III Sobieski Park) is the only mountain shelter in Poland, located in the city center PTTK Harcówka.

Nature protection 
Protected areas in Wałbrzych

 Książ Landscape Park – northern outskirts of the city
 Przełomy pod Książem Nature reserve – northern outskirts of the city
 Sudety Wałbrzyskie Landscape Park – southern outskirts of the city
 Chełmiec Mountain Natura 2000 area – western outskirts of the city

There are several natural monuments in the city; among them is the coat of arms oak, a descendant of the oak which was the inspiration for the coat of arms of the city, as evidenced by a nearby stone with the inscription "" ('City oak planted in 1933 in place of the coat of arms oak').

Sights 

Książ Castle, the largest Silesian castle, the third-largest castle in Poland behind Kraków's Wawel Castle and the Malbork Castle Rebuilt in 1962-1964.
Old Książ Castle (Stary Książ). Gothic ruins opposite (across a valley) Książ Castle 
Nowy Dwór Castle. The ruins of the castle Nowy Dwór (Ogorzelec) are on the top of Castle Hill (618 m)
Czettritz Castle (1604–1628), now the Angelus Silesius State College
Sanctuary of Our Lady of Sorrows. Gothic church, rebuilt into a Baroque style. Sanctuary of Our Lady of Sorrows placed in the center of Wałbrzych and is the oldest building of the city, called by the inhabitants "the heart of the city"
Town Hall (Ratusz). A representative three-storey building maintained in the style of historical eclecticism, imitating gothic
Palmiarnia (Palm House)
Market square (renovated 1997–1999). A place where a weekly market took place in the past. In the years 1731-1853 its center was occupied by the Baroque town hall.
Museum of Porcelain in the old Alberti Palace
Guardian Angels Church.
Protestant church. Designed in the years 1785-1788 by Carl Gotthard Langhans, the founder of the Berlin Brandenburg Gate
Mausoleum in Wałbrzych. A 1938 monument designed by Robert Tischler to commemorate the Silesian dead of World War I, as well as 23 early Nazis from Silesia. A metal torch on a tall column once at the center of the courtyard was designed by Ernst Geiger. The site is locally rumored to have been used for Nazi SS occult rituals.
Railway tunnel under the Little Wołowiec mountain. Counting 1,601 m (5,253 ft) is the longest railway tunnel in Poland
Mountain Borowa (black mountain). The highest mountain in the Wałbrzyskie Mountains, with observation tower.
Mountain Chełmiec. The second largest peak in the area. A monumental mountain in the shape of a dome that dominates the city. At the top there is an observation tower, 45 meter cross, and two radio-television masts
Old Mine – Center for Science and the Arts (Stara Kopalnia - Centrum Nauki i Sztuki)is the biggest post-industrial tourist attraction in Poland, located in the former bituminous coal mine – Kopalnia Węgla Kamiennego "Julia" ("Thorez"). It covers the area of 4.5 hectares of historic post-industrial objects with authentic equipment, such as a machine park which has been secured and made accessible for visitors.
Mining monuments in the city have been a lot of post-mining objects, among others, buildings, halls and mining towers.
Mining and Motorsports Museum at the Ayrton Senna street.
Ayrton Senna's statue located next to the Mining and Motorsports Museum museum at the Ayrton Senna street.

Transport

Roads 
National roads

 ( A4 autostrada/ Bielany Wrocławskie-Świdnica-Wałbrzych-Golińsk- Czech border)

Voivodeship roads

Public transport 
There are 14 bus lines in the city

Railway 
There are two main directions of passenger railways in the city, which include:
 Wrocław - Wałbrzych - Jelenia Góra (No. 274)
 Wałbrzych - Kłodzko (No. 286)

There are railway stations throughout the city: Wałbrzych Miasto, Wałbrzych Fabryczny, Wałbrzych Szczawienko, Wałbrzych Centrum, and Wałbrzych Główny, from which from May to the end of September, the starting station for weekend holiday connections to Meziměstí / Adršpach-Teplice Rocks.

Aviation 
The nearest airport is Wrocław airport located 70 km from the city, in the closer distance, about 10 km, is located light aircraft landing ground in Świebodzice.

City districts 

Including date of incorporation into the city

Education 

 Angelus Silesius State University in Wałbrzych
 Wrocław Technical University in Wałbrzych
 Wałbrzyska Wyższa Szkoła Zarządzania i Przedsiębiorczości
 Ignacy Paderewski High School
 Hugo Kołłątaj High School
 Mikołaj Kopernik High School
 The city has a research center, Polish Academy of Sciences

Politics

Wałbrzych constituency 
Members of Parliament (Sejm) elected from Wałbrzych constituency:
 Zbigniew Chlebowski, PO
 Henryk Gołębiewski, SLD
 Roman Ludwiczuk, PO (Senat)
 Katarzyna Mrzygłocka, PO
 Giovanni Roman, PiS
 Mieczysław Szyszka, PiS (Senat)
 Anna Zalewska, PiS

Sports 

 Górnik Wałbrzych is a professional men's basketball club, two times Polish champions. Currently, it plays in the Polish 3rd league. Last time Górnik played in the Polish Basketball League (the Polish top basketball league) was in 2009.
 Górnik Wałbrzych is a professional men's football club playing in the Polish 4th league (5th level). It played in the Ekstraklasa (top tier) in the 1980s.
 Zagłębie Wałbrzych is a male and female football club. Men's club section played in the Ekstraklasa in the 1960s and 1970s, finishing 3rd in 1971. Participated in the UEFA Cup competitions, reaching the 1/16 finals.
 KK Wałbrzych (formerly Górnik Nowe Miasto Wałbrzych) is a semi-professional men's basketball club playing in the Polish 3rd league.
 Chełmiec Wałbrzych is a professional men's and women's volleyball sports team.

There are many semi-professional or amateur football clubs (like Czarni Wałbrzych, Juventur Wałbrzych, Podgórze Wałbrzych, Gwarek Wałbrzych and one basketball club (KS Dark Dog plays in the Polish 3rd league).
 LKKS Górnik Wałbrzych is a cycling club
 Wałbrzych native Sebastian Janikowski is a placekicker in the NFL.
 ASZ PWSZ Walbrzych is a level 1 women's soccer team in Ekstraliga

Media 
 New Walbrzych Headlines
 Tygodnik Wałbrzyski
 www.walbrzych.info
 TV Zamkowa
 TV Walbrzych
 30 minut – Gazeta która nie ma ceny ((Free) Newspaper – that does not have a price)

Notable people 

 Wolfgang Menzel (1798–1873), German poet, critic and literary historian
 Gerhard Menzel (1894–1966), German writer
 Abraham Robinson (1918–1974), German-Jewish-American mathematician
 Klaus Töpfer (born 1938), German politician (CDU), born 1938 in Waldenburg
 Christian Brückner (born 1943), German actor
 Marcel Reif (born 1949), German soccer journalist 
 Urszula Włodarczyk (born 1965), Polish heptathlete
 Joanna Bator (born 1968), Polish Nike Award-winning novelist, journalist, feminist and academic
 Piotr Giro (born 1974), Polish-Swedish dancer and choreographer
 Leszek Lichota (born 1977), Polish actor
 Krzysztof Ignaczak (born 1978), Polish volleyball player
 Sebastian Janikowski (born 1978), former American football placekicker
 Adrian Mrowiec (born 1983), Polish footballer
 Bartosz Kurek (born 1988), Polish volleyball player and World Champion

Twin towns – sister cities

Wałbrzych is twinned with:

 Boryslav, Ukraine (2009)
 Cape Breton, Canada (2019)
 Dnipro, Ukraine (2001)
 Foggia, Italy (1998)
 Freiberg, Germany (1991)
 Gżira, Malta (2000)
 Hradec Králové, Czech Republic (1991)
 Jastarnia, Poland (1997)

 Vannes, France (2001)

References 

Bibliography

External links 

 Wałbrzych official city website
 Wałbrzych information website
 Jewish Community in Wałbrzych on Virtual Shtetl
 Wałbrzych - Waldenburg, Borowieck (tylko w 1945) na portalu polska-org.pl 
 Local news website (pol)
 Wałbrzych photo gallery and local news

 
Cities and towns in Lower Silesian Voivodeship
Wałbrzych County